Mandera North is a constituency in Kenya. It is one of six constituencies in Mandera County.

Members of Parliament

Wards

References 

Constituencies in Mandera County